Amalie Jørgensen Vangsgaard (born 29 November 1996) is a Danish professional footballer who plays as a forward for French Division 1 Féminine club Paris Saint-Germain and the Denmark national team.

Club career
Vansgaard started her career with Danish side Fortuna Hjørring, helping them win the league and  2016 Danish Women's Cup. In 2019, she signed for FCN in Denmark, helping them win the 2020 Danish Women's Cup, their only major trophy.

In 2021, Vansgaard signed for Swedish club Linköping.

On 10 January 2023, Paris Saint-Germain announced the signing of Vangsgaard on a permanent deal until June 2025.

Career statistics

International

References

External links
 
 Profile at the Danish Football Association website

1996 births
Living people
Women's association football forwards
Danish women's footballers
Denmark women's international footballers
Elitedivisionen players
Damallsvenskan players
Division 1 Féminine players
Fortuna Hjørring players
Ballerup-Skovlunde Fodbold (women) players
FC Nordsjælland (women) players
Linköpings FC players
Paris Saint-Germain Féminine players
Danish expatriate women's footballers
Danish expatriate sportspeople in Sweden
Danish expatriate sportspeople in France
Expatriate women's footballers in Sweden
Expatriate women's footballers in France

Association football forwards
Denmark international footballers